Megachile ctenophora is a species of bee in the family Megachilidae. It was described by Holmberg in 1886.

References

Ctenophora
Insects described in 1886